The 2020 Texas Tech Red Raiders football team represented Texas Tech University in the 2020 NCAA Division I FBS football season. The team was led by Matt Wells in his second season as the program's 16th head coach. The Red Raiders played their home games on the university's campus in Lubbock, Texas at Jones AT&T Stadium, and competed as members of the Big 12 Conference.

On December 14, just over a week after the team's game against Kansas, offensive coordinator David Yost was fired. The Red Raiders finished the season with the 60th ranked offense in FBS, averaging 29.1 points per game.

Previous season
The Red Raiders completed 2019 season with a record of 4–8, 2–7 in conference play to finish ninth in the conference. The season was promising from the Red Raiders with the first season in the new era of Matt Wells, however, after many short-comings, the Raiders were not invited to any other postseason play/didn't qualify for it.

Preseason

Recruiting class
References:

|}

Award watch lists
Listed in the order that they were released

Big 12 media days
The Big 12 media days were held on July 21–22, 2020 in a virtual format due to the COVID-19 pandemic.

Big 12 media poll

Preseason All-Big 12 teams

Schedule
Texas Tech had games scheduled against Alabama State, Arizona, and UTEP, but were canceled due to the COVID-19 pandemic.

Schedule Source:

Personnel

Game summaries

Houston Baptist

Texas Tech opened up the 2020 season at home against FCS opponent Houston Baptist. The Red Raiders' defense struggled to contain the Huskies' offense, giving up 600 total yards and allowing Houston Baptist quarterback Bailey Zappe to throw for 567 yards and four touchdowns.

Texas Tech received the opening kickoff and quickly went downfield with Alan Bowman finding Erik Ezukanma for a 7-yard touchdown pass with 13:22 left in the first quarter. Houston Baptist responded on its first drive with a 40-yard field goal from Gino Garcia to make it 7–3. The Red Raiders started their second drive on their own 25-yard line, with SaRodorick Thompson running for 3 yards on the first play. On the next play, Bowman found T. J. Vasher for a 12-yard pass, but on the next play Isaiah Cash intercepted a Bowman pass near midfield for the Huskies. Houston Baptist quarterback Bailey Zappe was sacked by Jaylon Hutchings for a 5-yard loss, Zappe threw an incomplete pass on the next play, then the Huskies were moved back another 5 yards following a false start penalty. On 3rd and 20 at the 50-yard line, the Huskies managed to gain back the lost yardage from the sack and penalty and punted the ball, which was downed at the Texas Tech 5-yard line. The Red Raiders went 95-yards downfield, ending the drive with a 5-yard touchdown run from Thompson to take a 14–3 lead.

On their next drive, the Huskies made it to the Texas Tech 1-yard line, but a pass by wide receiver Jerreth Sterns was intercepted by Zech McPhearson. The two teams traded punts, before Texas Tech scored another touchdown on a 1-yard run from Tahj Brooks; Houston Baptist responded on the following drive with its first touchdown of the game, a 65-yard pass from Zappe to D. J. Dormeus. The Red Raiders went three-and-out on their next drive, gaining just 3 yards. The Huskies started the next drive at their own 29-yard line and made it all the way to the Texas Tech 1-yard line. On 4th and goal from the 1-yard line, Houston Baptist went for it, but Sterns failed to get it in the end zone, turning the ball over on downs. Texas Tech ran out the clock to end the half with a 21–10 lead.

Both teams started the half by punting on their respective opening drives. On their second drive of the half, the Huskies started a comeback attempt with Garcia making a 44-yard field goal to make it 13–21. Texas Tech made it to the Houston Baptist 42-yard line on the next drive before punting the ball. The Huskies started the next drive on their own 20-yard line, with the first play being an Ean Beek run for a loss of 5 yards. On the next play, Zappe found Sterns for a 30-yard pass. The next play was quickly blown dead due to an illegal holding penalty against Houston Baptist, moving the team back 10 yards. Following the penalty, Zappe threw a 65-yard pass to Sterns for a touchdown, trailing 20–21 with 5:40 left in the third. The Red Raiders responded with an 11 play, 75-yard drive that culminated with 8-yard touchdown run from Thompson. The quarter ended with a 14-yard pass from Zappe to Ben Ratzlaff, putting Houston Baptist in Texas Tech territory.

The Huskies' drive stalled and the team was forced to punt from the Texas Tech 40-yard line, downing the ball at the 16-yard line. The Red Raiders quickly went down field, capping the drive with an 18-yard touchdown pass from Bowman to KeSean Carter to extend the lead to 35–20. The fifteen point lead would be short lived, as Houston Baptist responded on the first play the following drive, with Zappe throwing a 75-yard touchdown pass to Sterns. Texas Tech had a chance to out the game away on its following drive, but turned the ball over on downs at the Houston Baptist 4-yard line with 5:25 left in regulation. The Red Raiders' defense gave up two big plays on the Huskies' next offensive drive: a 45-yard pass that put the Huskies into Texas Tech territory and a 27-yard pass to put them at the 2-yard line. On 1st and goal from the 2-yard line, Beek attempted to run it into the end zone, but was tackled for a 4-yard loss. The Huskies found the end zone on the next play with Zappe throwing a 6-yard pass to Sterns to make it 33–35 with 3:23 left in regulation. Houston Baptist went for a two-point conversion, but Zappe's pass was incomplete. Garcia kicked the ball back to Texas Tech, with the ball landing in the end zone for a touchback. The Huskies' defense failed to stop the Red Raiders, who ran out the clock to end the game with a 35–33 victory.

Texas

The defensive struggles for Texas Tech continued in the first half of the game, giving up 31 points to the Texas offense. After being down 21–31 at halftime, the Red Raiders stormed back in the 3rd quarter, scoring 21 points while only giving up 7, to lead 42–38 heading into the 4th. The Longhorns scored a touchdown with 2:39 left in the 4th to trail 48–56. Texas recovered an onside kick on the ensuing kickoff and scored another touchdown on the drive to trail 54–56 and made the two-point conversion to tie the game 56–56 with 0:40 left in regulation. The Longhorns would go on to win the game in overtime after scoring a touchdown and intercepting an Alan Bowman pass to end the game.

at Kansas State

at Iowa State

West Virginia

Oklahoma

at TCU

Baylor

This is the first game between the Red Raiders and Bears to be played in Lubbock since the 2008 season.

The Red Raiders took an early 3–0 lead with a 48-yard field goal Jonathan Garibay, who was making his first collegiate start after struggles from incumbent starter Trey Wolff. The Bears would score the first touchdown of the game late in the quarter, with Jalen Pitre intercepting an Alan Bowman (who was in the series over starter Henry Colombi) pass and returning it 26-yards for a pick six touchdown. The rest of the half would be a defensive battle between the two teams, with Baylor's John Mayers making two field goals in the 2nd quarter (one from 22-yards and the other from 48-yards) and Garibay making a 28-yard attempt. At halftime, the Bears led 13–6.

The Bears would score the first offensive touchdown of the game, with a 5-yard run from quarterback Charlie Brewer. Texas Tech responded on its next possession with a 1-yard run from Tahj Brooks, but Garibay's point-after-attempt was blocked. The last score of the third quarter would be a 23-yard field goal from Mayers. Trailing 12–23 enter the 4th quarter, the Red Raiders scored 12 unanswered points while shutting out the Bears completely. On the last drive of the game, Bowman, who was in for an injured Colombi, marched the offense down the field to the Baylor 7-yard line. Garibay kicked the game-winning 25-yard field goal as time expired to give Texas Tech the 24–23 victory.

at Oklahoma State

Kansas

On the Thursday before the game, head coach Matt Wells tested positive for COVID-19. Wells handled coaching duties remotely while defensive coordinator Keith Patterson served as the team's head coach for the game.

The Red Raiders committed four turnovers and missed three field goals during the game, while the Jayhawks committed no turnovers, but failed three 4th down conversions and only had 214 yards of total offense compared to Texas Tech's 410 yards.

Statistics

Scoring
Scores against all opponents

Weekly awards
 Big 12 Defensive Player of the Week
Krishon Merriweather (week 1 vs. Houston Baptist)

 Big 12 Special Teams Player of the Week
Jonathan Garibay (week 10 vs. Baylor)

 Big 12 Newcomer of the Week
Colin Schooler (week 10 vs. Baylor)

Players drafted into the NFL

References

Texas Tech
Texas Tech Red Raiders football seasons
Texas Tech Red Raiders football